Figure of Insensitivity (F of I) is an inverse scale of measure of the impact sensitivity of an explosive substance.  In this particular context the term 'Insensitivity' refers to the likelihood of initiation/detonation by impact, friction, electrostatic discharge, application of flame, etc. It is a quantitative measure of the level of stimulus required to cause explosive decomposition. 

The figure of insensitivity is determined from impact testing, typically using a drop-weight tower. In this test, a small sample of the explosive is placed on a small steel anvil which is slotted into a recess in the base of the drop tower. A cylindrical, 1 kilogram steel weight (mounted inside a tube to accurately guide its descent to the impact point in the centre of the anvil) is then dropped onto the test specimen from a measured height. The specimen is monitored both during and after this process to determine whether initiation occurs. This test is repeated many times, varying the drop height according to a prescribed method. Various heights are used, starting with a small distance (e.g. 10 cm) and then progressively increasing it to as high as 3 metres. The series of drop heights and whether initiation occurred are analysed statistically to determine the drop height which has a 50% likelihood of initiating the explosives. The intention of these tests is to develop safety policies/rules which will govern the design, manufacturing, handling and storage of the explosive and any munitions containing it.

A reference standard sample of RDX is currently used to calibrate the drop tower, so that the drop height to produce 50% likelihood of initiation in this material is measured and recorded. The drop height required to initiate other explosives can then be related to the RDX standard, so that a ready comparison of impact sensitivity between different explosives can be made.  By convention, explosives having a 50% initiation drop height equal to that of RDX are given a F of I of 80.

The scale was originally defined using TNT as the reference standard, with TNT having, by definition, an F of I of exactly 100. On this original scale, RDX yielded an F of I of around 80.  Following World War II, when more complex explosive compositions replaced pure TNT as the most common energetic component of weapon systems, RDX was adopted as the reference standard.

Sensitivity should not be confused with Sensitiveness which is a measure of how easy it is to detonate an explosive.  In this context an explosive with more sensitiveness requires a smaller detonator or gayne to detonate it.

See also
 Safety testing of explosives

External links
 "Safety Cases for Explosive Sites" by Robert D. Wilcox, 2003. (This paper states that TNT has a defined F of I equal to 100.)

Explosives engineering